The Walt Whitman Birthplace State Historic Site is a state historic site in West Hills, New York, listed on the National Register of Historic Places. The site preserves the birthplace of American poet Walt Whitman.

History
The Whitman family's connection to Long Island dates back to the early 17th century and their property once covered 500 acres. Walter Whitman Sr., father of the poet, built this farmhouse in West Hills near Huntington, New York in 1816. Whitman Sr. was a Quaker and a carpenter and he built the two-story, cedar-shingled farmhouse by hand. The future poet was born here three years later in 1819. The Whitman family's other three children were born here as well. When Walt Jr. was five years old, the family moved to Brooklyn.

Whitman worked at various times as a printer, a schoolteacher, a journalist, a volunteer nurse during the Civil War, and a newspaper publisher. He returned to Long Island at age 17 to teach at a local school and founded the Long Islander newspaper. He eventually authored a book of poetry, Leaves of Grass, which sold poorly when first published but has over time come to be considered a masterpiece of world literature. The museum's web site says:

Near the end of his life, he returned to the area and, as he reported, "rode around all the old familiar spots, viewing and pondering and dwelling long upon them, everything coming back to me from fifty years". Lilacs which grew on the property inspired Whitman's poem "When Lilacs Last in the Dooryard Bloom'd".

Museum today
The Walt Whitman Birthplace State Historic Site & Interpretive Center is operated by the Walt Whitman Birthplace Association (WWBA), which was formed in 1949 to preserve the home. It was designated a New York State Historic Site in 1957 and in 1985 was added to both the New York State Register and National Register of Historic Places. It is run in collaboration with the New York State Office of Parks, Recreation and Historic Preservation. The site consists of three structures: The historic Birthplace which is maintained as the Museum, an interpretive center, and a gathering house used for exhibitions and meetings. The interpretive center includes displays of portraits, letters, and manuscripts and showcases Whitman's voice reading a few lines of his poem "America", originally recorded on an Edison wax cylinder.

The site offers guided tours, exhibits, an audio-visual show, events, a poet-in-residence program, and an annual poetry contest for local grade school students. The museum has nineteenth century furnishings, 130 Whitman portraits, original manuscripts and letters, artifacts, Whitman's voice on tape, and his schoolmaster's desk.

The museum is open every day June 15 through Labor Day except for major holidays. In the winter it is open Wednesday through Sunday. There is a museum gift shop. Tours for school classes and other large groups may be arranged in advance.

See also
 List of New York State Historic Sites
 Walt Whitman House in Camden, New Jersey

References

External links

Walt Whitman Birthplace State Historic Site at NYS Office of Parks, Recreation and Historic Preservation

Walt Whitman Birthplace State Historic Site and Interpretive Center, administered by the Walt Whitman Birthplace Association

  

Houses on the National Register of Historic Places in New York (state)
Historic American Buildings Survey in New York (state)
New York (state) historic sites
Walt Whitman Birthplace State Historic Site
Biographical museums in New York (state)
Literary museums in the United States
Walt Whitman Birthplace State Historic Site
Historic house museums in New York (state)
Birthplaces of individual people
National Register of Historic Places in Suffolk County, New York
Houses completed in 1815
Whitman, Walt Birthplace
Birthplace State Historic Site